The Infinity Doctors is a BBC Books original novel written by Lance Parkin and based on the long-running British science fiction television series Doctor Who. The book was released to commemorate the 35th anniversary of the series, and features several references to the series' past.

Synopsis

During the Dark Time, the Gallifreyan scientist Omega leaves his wife to travel to the star that will give his people the power to become Lords of Time when he causes it to go supernova. But things do not go as planned and Omega is lost inside a black hole.
Millions of years later, an unknown version of the Doctor, his friend the Magistrate and star pupil Larna, together with the rest of the Time Lords are preparing to host a peace conference between the Sontarans and the Rutans to end their thousand-year war. But behind the scenes a masked figure arranges a kidnapping and robbery in the Doctor's rooms and a strange anomaly appears across the universe, which seemingly has the power to alter the past and future. The epicentre of the effect is a black hole at the end of the universe to which the Doctor and his friends must travel to prevent disaster.

Interpretations

Incarnation of the Doctor
Among the possible explanations for which incarnation of the Doctor is featured include a young First Doctor who has yet to leave Gallifrey, a future Doctor past the last known incarnation (at the time the book was written, the Eighth Doctor was the current incarnation) or the Other, who may or may not be the Doctor. Parkin himself stated: "He's clearly not the eighth Doctor of mainstream continuity. He does look like Paul McGann."

Chronology
Parkin's guide to Doctor Who chronology, AHistory, contains a footnote stating that "fan consensus" places the novel on the reconstructed Gallifrey implied by the end of Parkin's The Gallifrey Chronicles (that is, between The Gallifrey Chronicles and "Rose").

References

External links

The Cloister Library - The Infinity Doctors

1998 British novels
1998 science fiction novels
Past Doctor Adventures
Novels by Lance Parkin
The Master (Doctor Who) novels